Xin'anjiang Subdistrict is a subdistrict in Jiande, Zhejiang, China. , it administers the following eleven residential communities and four villages: 
Baisha Community
Fudong Community
Fuxi Community
Cangtan Community
Luotong Community
Xin'an Community
Jian'an Community
Xitou Community
Mingzhu Community
Linghou Community
Yejia Community
Xinpeng Village
Meiping Village
Huangnidun Village
Fengchan Village

See also 
 List of township-level divisions of Zhejiang

References 

Township-level divisions of Zhejiang
Jiande